George Wales may refer to:

Prince George of Wales (born 2013), son of William, Prince of Wales, the heir apparent to the British throne
Prince George, Duke of Kent (1902–1942), born Prince George of Wales, the fourth son of King George V
George Edward Wales (1792–1860), American politician
George Wales (businessman) (1885–1962), Australian businessman and politician

See also
 George, Prince of Wales (disambiguation)